
Gmina Daszyna is a rural gmina (administrative district) in Łęczyca County, Łódź Voivodeship, in central Poland.

Villages
Gmina Daszyna contains the villages and settlements of Daszyna, Drzykozy, Gąsiorów, Goszczynno, Jabłonna, Jacków, Janice, Jarochów, Jarochówek, Karkoszki, Koryta, Krężelewice, Lipówka, Łubno, Mazew, Mazew-Kolonia, Miroszewice, Nowa Żelazna, Nowy Sławoszew, Ogrodzona, Opiesin, Osędowice, Rzędków, Siedlew, Skrzynki, Stara Żelazna, Stary Sławoszew, Upale, Walew, Żabokrzeki, Zagróbki and Zieleniew.

Neighbouring gminas
Gmina Daszyna is bordered by the gminas of Chodów, Grabów, Krośniewice, Kutno, Łęczyca and Witonia.

References
Polish official population figures 2006

Daszyna
Łęczyca County